A podvorotnichok is a narrow piece of white fabric formerly sewn on the inside of the collars of field uniforms in the Russian Armed Forces and some of the former Soviet republics' militaries, to reduce wear and tear on the collar and alleviate chafing. 

Podvorotnichoks were changed daily, typically in the evening before lights out, and checked during morning inspection. If a soldier's podvorotnichok was not snow-white or sewn correctly, he could be punished and made to resew it. Since the introduction of the modern VKPO uniform, podvorotnichoks and footwraps were phased out; podvorotnichok has not been mentioned in the Russian Armed Forces uniform list since the signing of Decree 300 by Defense Minister Sergei Shoigu on 22 June 2015.

Sources 
 Soviet Uniforms and Militaria 1917–1991, by László Békesi
 Inside the Soviet Army Today: Osprey Elite Military History Series No. 12, by Stephen J. Zaloga

See also
 Afghanka
 Panamanka

References

Military uniforms
Military equipment of Russia
Russian clothing